Antonio de Pereda y Salgado ( – January 30, 1678) was a Spanish Baroque-era painter, best known for his still lifes.

Biography 
Pereda was born in Valladolid, the eldest of three brothers from an artistic family. His father, mother and two brothers were all painters. He was educated in Madrid by Pedro de las Cuevas and was taken under the protective wing of the influential Giovanni Battista Crescenzi.  

As well as still lifes and religious paintings, Pereda was known for his historical paintings such as the Relief of Genoa (1635), depicting a historical event of the 1620s. This was painted for the Salón de Reinos of the Buen Retiro Palace in Madrid as part of the same series as Velázquez's Surrender of Breda.
After Crescenzi's death in 1635, Pereda was expelled from the court and began to take commissions from religious institutions.

Works

 The Relief of Genoa (El Socorro a Génova), 1634
 Agila, 1635, painted for the collection of series of Gothic kings at the Palacio del Buen Retiro, Museo del Prado.
 Desengaño de la vida, around 1634
 Immaculate (Immaculada), several paintings now at several museums including the Prado (1636 painting), the Museo de Ponce, Puerto Rico (1654 painting), Hospital de la Venerable Orden Tercera in Madrid (1657 painting), Lyon, Budapest, etc.
 Annunciation, 1637, Prado
 Los desposorios de la Virgen con San José, 1640
 San Jerónimo penitente and San Pedro liberado por el ángel, 1643, Prado.
 Profesión de la infanta Margarita con San Agustín y la Virgen en gloria, 1650, Convento de la Encarnación, Madrid.
 Curación de Tobías, Barnard Castle, Bowes Museum, 1652.
 San José (Saint Joseph), Madrid, Royal Palace, 1654.
 El Salvador, 1655, now at the Capilla del Cristo and at San Ginés church, Madrid.
 Santo Domingo en Soriano (St. Dominic in Soriano), 1655, Museo Cerralbo.
 Elías y los profetas de Baal (Elijah and the Prophets of Baal), 1659, Madrid, parroquia del Carmen y San Luis
 The Sacrifice of Isaac, Dallas Museum of Art
 San Francisco de Asís en la Porciúncula (St. Francis of Assisi and the Porziuncola), 1664, Museo de Valladolid.
 San Jerónimo y la visión del Juicio Final, 1668, private collection.
 San Guillermo de Aquitania (St. William of Aquitaine), 1672, Real Academia de Bellas Artes de San Fernando.
 Several paintings of Bodegón including the Museo d'Arte Antiga, Lisbon, Helsinki (bodegón de frutas y bodegón de cocina) and The Pushkin Museum, Moscow (bodegón de legumbres, 1651).
 Vanitas, (versions at the Uffizi, Florence, where it has been attributed to Juan de Valdés Leal, and at the Museum of Fine Arts, Zaragoza), without date or signature, possibly corresponding to his final stage
 The Knight's Dream (El sueño del caballero), Museo de la Real Academia de Bellas Artes de San Fernando
 Canticle of Saint Simon, Musée Condé, Chantilly
Saint Peter Repentant (San Pedro arrepentido), Museo de la Real Academia de Bellas Artes de San Fernando.

Gallery

References

External links
 Scholarly articles about Antonio de Pereda both in web and PDF @ the Spanish Old Masters Gallery
Antonio de Pereda on Artcyclopedia
Jusepe de Ribera, 1591-1652, a full text exhibition catalog from The Metropolitan Museum of Art, which includes material on Antonio de Pereda (see index)

Spanish Baroque painters
1611 births
1678 deaths
Baroque painters